Saul Turteltaub (May 5, 1932 – April 9, 2020) was an American comedy writer and producer. He was nominated for Emmy Awards in 1964 and 1965 as part of the writing team for That Was the Week that Was, and in 1968 for The Carol Burnett Show. Most commonly working with collaborator Bernie Orenstein, he wrote and produced That Girl, Sanford and Son (and its spin-offs Grady and Sanford Arms), What's Happening!!, Baby Talk, and Kate & Allie, among others.

Born in Teaneck, New Jersey, Turteltaub was raised in nearby Englewood. Turteltaub attended Columbia University, and received his bachelor's degree and then, in 1957, his law degree. He had also served in Army. He married Shirley in 1960 and had sons named Adam and Jon.

Turteltaub died at his home in Beverly Hills, California in April 2020, at the age of 87.

References

External links

Interview at the Television Academy
Finding aid to Saul Turteltaub papers at Columbia University. Rare Book & Manuscript Library.

1932 births
2020 deaths
American Jews
American television writers
People from Beverly Hills, California
People from Englewood, New Jersey
People from Teaneck, New Jersey
Columbia College (New York) alumni
Columbia Law School alumni